Rhinorhynchus rufulus is a weevil in the Nemonychidae family. It is found in New Zealand and was first described by Thomas Broun in 1880.

References

Weevils
Beetles of New Zealand
Beetles described in 1880